Sarah Maple is a British visual artist. She was recognised for her work after being awarded the "New Sensations" prize.

Early life and education
Maple was born in 1985 to a Kenyan Muslim mother and British father.  In 2003, she went through a Foundation Course at the University of the Creative Arts. Four years later, she received a BA of Fine Art with honours at Kingston University.

Awards 
In 2007 she won the "4 New Sensations" competition, run by Channel 4 in conjunction with the Saatchi Gallery.  The competition's aim is "to find the most exciting and imaginative artistic talent in the UK" from among art students graduating that year.

In 2015 she won a Sky Academy Arts Scholarship to produce a new body of work for a new solo exhibition in 2017  Maple has exhibited her work at galleries and institutions such as Tate Britain, The New Art Exchange, Golden Thread Gallery  and Kunstihoone Tallinn 

In 2015 she released her first book You Could Have Done This, a hardback art book of selected works with contributions from Beverley Knowles (curator and writer), Margaret Harrison (artist), Oreet Ashery (artist) and Anne Swartz (professor Art History)

References

External links

Interview with Sarah Maple on Indechs - contemporary online archive
Interview with Sarah Maple on Myartspace
Interview with The Independent

Living people
British women artists
English artists
Feminist artists
1985 births